Abid Hasan (born 29 April 1995) is a Pakistani cricketer who plays for Rawalpindi. He made his Twenty20 debut on 14 January 2020, for Galle Cricket Club in the 2019–20 SLC Twenty20 Tournament in Sri Lanka.

References

External links
 

1995 births
Living people
Pakistani cricketers
Rawalpindi cricketers
Galle Cricket Club cricketers
Cricketers from Rawalpindi